Charles Kahn could refer to: 

Charles H. Kahn, American classicist and academic
Charles N. Kahn III (born 1952), president and chief executive officer of the Federation of American Hospitals